"Makin' It" is a 1979 disco song performed by David Naughton, his only musical release. It was the theme song for the television series Makin' It, in which Naughton starred. It was written by the successful songwriting team Freddie Perren and Dino Fekaris. It was released as both a 7-inch single and a 12-inch single, with an instrumental version of the song titled "Still Makin' It" as the B-side.

Early pressings of this record stated that it was from the Makin' It television show. Later pressings stated it was from the comedy film Meatballs starring Bill Murray.

"Makin' It" appeared in the top 40 of the Billboard Hot 100 chart for 16 weeks, and in the top 10 for five weeks. It debuted at #89 on March 31, peaking at #5 for two weeks, July 21 and July 28. On Billboard's Disco Action Top 40 Chart, the song peaked at number 11 in its March 10, 1979, issue during its 17-week run.

Chart performance

Weekly charts

Year-end charts

Popular culture
The song also appeared on the soundtrack of the comedy film Meatballs (1979) 
It appears in a 2017 television commercial for Subway, promoting an Autumn Carved Turkey sandwich

References

External links
 Song Lyrics

1979 songs
1979 singles
Comedy television theme songs
Disco songs
Songs written by Freddie Perren
Songs written by Dino Fekaris
RSO Records singles
Song recordings produced by Freddie Perren